The 179th Reserve Panzer Division of the German army in World War II was formed in July 1943. The division was stationed in France from July 1943 to May 1944 when it was disbanded and absorbed by the 116th Panzer Division.

Commanders  
Generalmajor Herbert Stimmel
Generalleutnant Max von Hartlieb-Walsporn (1940-06-20 - 1940-05-22)
Generalleutnant Walter von Boltenstern (1943-07-30 - 1944-05-10)

Order of battle 
Reserve-Panzer-Abteilung I (Reserve Armoured Unit I)
Reserve-Panzergrenadier-Regiment 81 (Reserve Armoured Infantry Regiment 81)
Reserve-Grenadier-Regiment (mot.) 29 (Reserve Grenadier Regiment (mechanised) 29)
Reserve-Artillerie-Abteilung 29 (Reserve Artillery Unit 29)
Reserve-Panzeraufklärungs-Abteilung 1 (Reserve Armoured Reconnaissance Unit 1)
Reserve-Panzerjäger-Abteilung 9  (Reserve Tank Destroyer Unit 9)
Reserve-Panzerversorgungstruppen (Reserve armoured supply units)

References 
Microfilm Publication A-3356, German Officer Personnel files, NARA

German panzer divisions
Military units and formations established in 1943
Military units and formations disestablished in 1944